Park Sang-hee is a Korean name consisting of the family name Park and the given name Sang-hee. It may refer to:

 Park Sang-hee (footballer) (born 1987), South Korean footballer
 Park Sang-hee (tennis) (born 1995), South Korean tennis player